Shaheedanwali is a village and Union Council of Mandi Bahauddin District in the Punjab province of Pakistan. It is situated 04 km east of the district capital - Mandi Bahauddin , 4 km west of the town of Chillianwala.and 4 km south of the town of Mong. The population of  Shaheedanwali is about 28,000.

Shaheedanwali is a well-cultivated area; the main crops are wheat, rice , sugar cane and different Vegetables. Most people are farmers and government servants. A Govt. Boys primary school and Govt. Girls primary was established. Govt. Girls primary has been converted into a high school and Govt Boys Primary School has been converted into middle school.

References 

Villages in Mandi Bahauddin District
Union councils of Mandi Bahauddin District